|}

The Molecomb Stakes is a Group 3 flat horse race in Great Britain open to two-year-old horses. It is run at Goodwood over a distance of 5 furlongs (1,006 metres), and it is scheduled to take place each year in late July or early August.

History
The event is named after Molecomb, a house on the Goodwood Estate originally built by the 3rd Duke of Richmond for his sister Lady Sarah Lennox. The race was established in 1829, and the inaugural running was won by Convert.

The Molecomb Stakes was originally open to two-year-olds of either gender, but it was restricted to fillies in 1932. It was reopened to colts and geldings in 1981.

The race is currently held on the second day of the five-day Glorious Goodwood meeting.

Records

Leading jockey (8 wins):
 Lester Piggott – Abelia (1957), Smooth (1966), Flying Legs (1968), Lady Rowley (1974), Hayloft (1975), Marwell (1980), Prowess Prince (1981), Precocious (1983)

Leading trainer (7 wins):
 John Barham Day – Waresti (1834), Grey Momus (1837), Wapiti (1838), Crucifix (1839), The Ugly Buck (1843), Nutbourne (1844), Elmsthorpe (1852)
 John Porter – Red Hazard (1877), St Blaise (1882), Luminary (1884), Freedom (1886), Friar's Balsam (1887), La Fleche (1891), Rampion (1895)

Winners since 1980

Earlier winners

 1829: Convert
 1830: filly by Emilius
 1831–32: no race
 1833: Defensive
 1834: Waresti
 1835: Elis
 1836: Defender
 1837: Grey Momus
 1838: Wapiti
 1839: Crucifix
 1840: Decision
 1841: Barrier
 1842: The Caster
 1843: The Ugly Buck
 1844: Nutbourne
 1845: Sting
 1846: Planet
 1847: Glendower
 1848: Mr Milner
 1849: William the Conqueror
 1850: Teddington
 1851: Glenluce
 1852: Elmsthorpe
 1853: Andover
 1854: Polydore
 1855: Enchanter
 1856: Lambourn
 1857: The Lord of Lorn
 1858: Merryman
 1859: Buccaneer
 1860: Diophantus
 1861: Ace of Clubs
 1862: colt by Lord of the Isles
 1863: Fille de l'Air
 1864: Koenig
 1865: The Student
 1866: Marksman
 1867: Banditto
 1868: Belladrum
 1869: Mantilla
 1870: General
 1871: Vanderdecken
 1872: Somerset
 1873: Packington
 1874: Craig Millar
 1875: Red Cross Knight
 1876: Shillelagh
 1877: Red Hazard
 1878: colt by Cambuscan
 1879: Brotherhood
 1880: Paw Paw
 1881: Adrastus
 1882: St Blaise
 1883: La Trappe
 1884: Luminary
 1885: The Devil to Pay
 1886: Freedom
 1887: Friar's Balsam
 1888: Seclusion
 1889: Le Nord
 1890: Cleator
 1891: La Fleche
 1892: Harbinger
 1893: La Nievre
 1894: Bentworth
 1895: Rampion
 1896: Galtee More
 1897: Royal Footstep
 1898: Vara
 1899: O'Donovan Rossa
 1900: Princess Melton
 1901: filly by Melton
 1902: Quintessence
 1903: Islesman
 1904: Vedas
 1905: Colonia
 1906: My Pet
 1907: Sea King
 1908: Perdiccas
 1909: Tressady
 1910: Beaurepaire
 1911: White Star
 1912: Rock Flint
 1913: Black Jester
 1914: Redfern
 1915–18: no race
 1919: Tetratema
 1920: Trash
 1921: Lembach
 1922: Town Guard
 1923: Mumtaz Mahal
 1924: Priory Park
 1925: Review Order
 1926: Shian Mor
 1927: Black Watch
 1928: Belle Mere
 1929: Diolite
 1930: Jacopo
 1931: Safe Return
 1932: Betty
 1933: Light Brocade
 1934: La Gaiete
 1935: Crosspatch
 1936: Bright Beam
 1937: Ann of Austria
 1938: Money Down
 1939: Allure
 1940: no race
 1941: Feberion *
 1942–45: no race
 1946: Rule Britannia
 1947: Phaetonia
 1948: Integrity
 1949: Diableretta
 1950: Crawley Beauty
 1951: Tayeh
 1952: Tessa Gillian
 1953: Urshalim
 1954: Brave Venture
 1955: Palariva
 1956: Pharsalia
 1957: Abelia
 1958: Krakenwake
 1959: Queensberry
 1960: Cynara
 1961: La Tendresse
 1962: Royal Indiscretion
 1963: Crimea II
 1964: Regal Pink
 1965: Reet Lass
 1966: Smooth
 1967: Lowna
 1968: Flying Legs
 1969: Mange Tout
 1970: Cawston's Pride
 1971: Pert Lassie
 1972: Miss Slip
 1973: Bitty Girl
 1974: Lady Rowley
 1975: Hayloft
 1976: Be Easy
 1977: Hatta
 1978: Greenland Park
 1979: Keep Off

* The 1941 running took place at Newmarket.

See also
 Horse racing in Great Britain
 List of British flat horse races

References
 Paris-Turf: 
 Racing Post:

 galopp-sieger.de – Molecomb Stakes.
 ifhaonline.org – International Federation of Horseracing Authorities – Molecomb Stakes (2019).
 pedigreequery.com – Molecomb Stakes – Goodwood.
 

Flat races in Great Britain
Goodwood Racecourse
Flat horse races for two-year-olds
Recurring sporting events established in 1829
1829 establishments in England